Lior "Or" Inbrum (born ) is an Israeli professional footballer who plays as a winger for Sektzia Ness Ziona.

Inbrum was born in Kiryat Gat, Israel, to an Ethiopian-Jewish family.

References

External links 
 

1996 births
Living people
Israeli footballers
People from Kiryat Gat
Footballers from Southern District (Israel)
Association football wingers
F.C. Ashdod players
K.A.A. Gent players
NK Maribor players
Beitar Jerusalem F.C. players
Hapoel Tel Aviv F.C. players
Maccabi Petah Tikva F.C. players
Hapoel Umm al-Fahm F.C. players
Sektzia Ness Ziona F.C. players
Liga Leumit players
Israeli Premier League players
Slovenian PrvaLiga players
Israel youth international footballers
Israel under-21 international footballers
Israeli expatriate footballers
Expatriate footballers in Belgium
Expatriate footballers in Slovenia
Israeli expatriate sportspeople in Belgium
Israeli expatriate sportspeople in Slovenia
Jewish Israeli sportspeople
Israeli people of Ethiopian-Jewish descent